The 2022 Varsity Cup was the 15th season of the Varsity Cup, the top competition in the annual Varsity Rugby series. It was played between 14 February and 25 April 2022 and featured ten university teams.

Competition rules and information

There were ten participating university teams in the 2022 Varsity Cup. They played each other once during the pool stage, either at home or away. Teams received four points for a win and two points for a draw. Bonus points were awarded to teams that scored four or more tries in a game, as well as to teams that lost a match by seven points or less. Teams were ranked by log points, then points difference (points scored less points conceded).

The top four teams after the pool stage qualified for the semifinals, which were followed by a final.

Teams

The teams that played in the 2022 Varsity Cup are:

Pool stage

Standings
The final log for the 2022 Varsity Cup was:

Matches

The following matches were played in the 2022 Varsity Cup:

Round one

Round two

Round three

Round four

Round five

Round six

Round seven

Round eight

Round nine

Play-offs

Semi-finals

Final

References

2022
2022 in South African rugby union
2022 rugby union tournaments for clubs